The 2016–17 season was Arsenal's 25th in the Premier League, their 98th consecutive season in the top flight of English football and their 107th season in the top flight overall. The club participated in the Premier League, FA Cup, EFL Cup and the UEFA Champions League.

In the league, despite being in the title race in the first half of the season, their form collapsed in the second half of the season, with Arsenal finishing outside the top four of the Premier League for the first time since the 1995–96 season. In Europe, despite topping their group, Bayern Munich inflicted Arsenal's heaviest defeat in a two-legged European tie with a 10–2 aggregate defeat, with increasing criticism towards manager Arsène Wenger, as well as calls for change within the Arsenal hierarchy. Despite the loss of form and heavy fan disapproval towards the end of the season, Arsenal won the FA Cup for a record 13th time, beating Chelsea 2–1 in the final. The victory saw manager Arsène Wenger become the most successful manager in FA Cup history with seven wins.

The season covers the period from 1 July 2016 to 30 June 2017.

Review

Pre-season
Arsenal made its first summer signing prior to start of the current season on 25 May, with the acquisition of Swiss midfielder Granit Xhaka for a reported £30 million fee. Xhaka's involvement in UEFA Euro 2016 and his subsequent desire to secure his club future beforehand enabled Arsenal to uncharacteristically complete a signing before the formal opening of the transfer window. In the following weeks, the Gunners activated the release clause of Leicester City forward Jamie Vardy. However, they failed in their attempts to bring Vardy from the Premier League champions, with the England forward instead opting to sign a contract extension with the East Midlands club. Manager Arsène Wenger came under fire for failing to secure the transfer, and fans were outraged further when Arsenal signed young forward Takuma Asano from Sanfrecce Hiroshima, due to the relative unproven nature of the forward's capabilities. Arsenal made its third summer signing on 22 July, signing Bolton Wanderers' Player of the Year Rob Holding. He joined for a reported £2 million fee from the League One side. Arsenal played Lens later that day in their first pre-season game, with a late chipped goal from Alex Oxlade-Chamberlain earning Arsenal a hard-fought 1–1 draw. Arsenal then flew out to California for two more pre-season fixtures, against the MLS All-Stars and Chivas Guadalajara. Wenger would state that Per Mertesacker would not be on the tour, after picking up an injury against Lens. He would later confirm that Mertesacker had surgery in his native Germany, and would be out for "months". Arsenal beat the All Stars 2–1 on 28 July (July 29 BST), with a Joel Campbell penalty and a Chuba Akpom close-range finish coming either side of a goal from Didier Drogba. Arsenal concluded their tour on 31 July (1 August BST) with a 3–1 win over Chivas. Oxlade-Chamberlain and Akpom scored their second pre-season goals each, with the opener scored by Holding. Wenger confirmed that the injury to Mertesacker meant he'd need to sign a replacement ideally before the season's opener against Liverpool on 14 August, as talks of incoming transfers intensified.

August

Despite the absence of key players, Wenger gave positive news ahead of a trip to Scandinavia; Alexis Sánchez and Aaron Ramsey would join the team for the tour and would likely be fit for the season's opener against Liverpool. Gabriel also returned after missing the US tour with tonsillitis.
Arsenal's pre-season continued in Norway, against Viking FK. The Gunners were 8–0 winners; Joel Campbell continued his pre-season form with a double, while Chuba Akpom added his third goal in as many pre-season games. Alex Iwobi also scored a late double, with the remaining goals coming from Theo Walcott, Santi Cazorla (although the Spaniard missed a third-minute penalty), and an own goal from defender Michael Haukås. In a post match interview, Wenger confirmed that Mesut Özil, Laurent Koscielny and Olivier Giroud would not be fit for the game against Liverpool in nine days, with the trio returning to training on 8 August due to their extended exploits at Euro 2016. He stated that Jack Wilshere would be in training after a knee injury, but he could also miss the opening game, and that Mertesacker would not be available for four months. Arsenal concluded their pre-season with a 3–2 win over Manchester City. Akpom scored for the fourth game running, while Walcott and Iwobi scored for the second successive game. Sergio Agüero and Kelechi Iheanacho scored either side of the Arsenal goals. The game ended on a sour note, however, with Gabriel sustaining a serious injury. The Brazilian was stretchered off, meaning Arsenal was left with Koscielny acting as the club's only available senior centre-back. Wenger's pre-match press conference ahead of the opening day clash with Liverpool was that Gabriel would be back by October, and that Carl Jenkinson (returning from a loan at West Ham United) would be fit in November after a knee injury suffered on loan in January.

Similar to last season, Arsenal could not carry on its pre-season form when the league season started. Despite goals from Walcott, Oxlade-Chamberlain and Calum Chambers, Arsenal lost 4–3 at home to Liverpool. The club's opening day defeat was the second in succession, and the third in four years (after defeats to Aston Villa and West Ham in 2013–14 and 2015–16, respectively). Walcott gave Arsenal the lead after missing a penalty, but a Philippe Coutinho free-kick drew the sides level before half-time. An Adam Lallana finish, a second for Coutinho, and a goal for debutant Sadio Mané saw Arsenal go behind 4–1 after 63 minutes. Alex Oxlade-Chamberlain pulled one back with a solo finish, and Calum Chambers headed in a Cazorla free kick. However, the Gunners failed to force a fourth in the final 15 minutes. Arsenal also had Ramsey limp off, making him Arsenal's fifth injured player in the senior team, alongside Jenkinson, Gabriel, Mertesacker and Danny Welbeck. Xhaka and Holding were given their debuts; Xhaka came off the bench in the second half, while the latter started alongside Chambers in defence.

Arsenal went to the King Power Stadium on the second matchday, facing champions Leicester City. Both teams were aiming to bounce back from opening-weekend losses, and while both squads had opportunities of their own, Arsenal enjoyed the better of the first half, with Oxlade-Chamberlain shooting narrowly wide. Despite various attacking exploits from either side in both halves, neither could not find a breakthrough in a fiercely-contested game, as it concluded 0–0. The result left the Gunners 12th, with one point from their first two games. Arsenal would then travel away to Watford, with both sides aiming to achieve their first wins of the campaign, after sustaining a defeat and a draw from the opening two league matches. Arsenal would gain the lead after Cazorla converted a penalty following a challenge from Nordin Amrabat on Sánchez, who would later score from a Walcott cross. Özil clinched Arsenal's third on the stroke of half-time, heading in from Sánchez's crisp pass into the box. Roberto Pereyra would also score for the Hornets on his debut midway through the second half, as Arsenal won 3–1. Arsenal would then announce the signings of Lucas Pérez on 28 August, with the forward joining from Deportivo de La Coruña after the Gunners activated the Spaniard's reported £17.1 million release clause. The deal proceeded Arsenal confirming the signing of German defender Shkodran Mustafi from Valencia on 30 August. Mustafi joined the Gunners for £35 million, making him the club's joint second most expensive player, with him commanding the same fee as Sánchez three seasons prior.

September
Following the international break, Arsenal resumed their Premier League campaign with a hard-fought 2–1 home victory over Southampton. Despite an unfortunate own goal by Petr Čech, the Gunners responded with two unanswered goals to ensure the win. In the first half, Laurent Koscielny equalised through a bicycle kick whilst Santi Cazorla struck a penalty in the dying minutes of the match to lead Arsenal to victory. Furthermore, the match saw the debuts of Shkodran Mustafi and Lucas Pérez, with the former making the most clearances and interceptions in the match. Arsenal would begin its 19th consecutive season in the UEFA Champions League three days later with a 1–1 away draw against Paris Saint-Germain. Despite going behind after 42 seconds following an Edinson Cavani header, Arsenal bounced back in the latter stages of the game, with Alexis Sánchez rifling in Arsenal's first shot on target. Olivier Giroud, who was brought on as a substitute, picked up two yellow cards in his 27 minutes, thus causing him to miss the home match against Basel on 28 September. Arsenal would then travel to newly promoted Hull City on 17 September. The Gunners took the lead through Sánchez, who deflected in Alex Iwobi's shot. Sánchez had a penalty saved before half time after a handball by Jake Livermore, who received a red card as a result. In the second half, Arsenal went 2–0 up through a Theo Walcott chip before Hull got a goal back, with Robert Snodgrass converting his penalty when Čech took down Dieumerci Mbokani. Sánchez got his second goal of the game with four minutes later, to restore the two-goal lead. Substitute Granit Xhaka scored his first goal in the last minute of stoppage time, with his 25-yard drive wrapping up a 4–1 win.

The club's next match saw Arsenal kick off their EFL Cup campaign away to Nottingham Forest. Xhaka opened the scoring with his second long range goal in the space of a week, and new signing Pérez scored a double before Oxlade-Chamberlain scored in stoppage time as Arsenal won 4–0, with Nicklas Bendtner making his first competitive appearance against his former side (having played an Emirates Cup friendly a year prior with VfL Wolfsburg). Arsenal were then drawn at home to Reading in the fourth round of the competition. Arsenal's next game saw them host Chelsea, a team the club had not beaten in the League since 2011. Arsenal ran riot in the first half, with Sánchez, Walcott and Mesut Özil all finding the back of the net. The half time score of 3–0 remained unchanged at the final whistle. Arsenal's final game of September saw them host Basel in the Champions League, which was the first ever meeting between the clubs in European competition. Xhaka started against the team he began his career with, and also faced his brother Taulant for the first time in club football while Mohamed Elneny was also brought on as a substitute against his former side. Walcott scored a first half double, with a brace in assists from Sánchez, securing a 2–0 win.

October
Arsenal resumed Premier League action on 2 October, facing Burnley at Turf Moor. Burnley often chose to sit back during the game, allowing Arsenal to apply attacking pressure, although, both had chances to win the match. Arsenal's pressure finally got to a resistant Burnley side, with Laurent Koscielny scoring at a last minute corner. The controversial goal had claims off both handball and offside, after the defender knocked the ball in with his elbow on the goal-line. Burnley manager Sean Dyche questioned referee Craig Pawson following the game, as the referee had a clear sight of the incident. Retired referee Dermot Gallagher, however, stood by the ruling, claiming it was not an intentional handball. Arsenal hosted Swansea City after the international break, looking for its first home win against the Swans since September 2011. Theo Walcott scored his fourth and fifth league goals early on, giving Arsenal a two-goal lead before Gylfi Sigurðsson pulled one back before the break. Mesut Özil added a third on his 28th birthday, before Borja reduced the deficit once more. A controversial red card for a cynical Granit Xhaka challenge on Modou Barrow set up a dramatic finale, but Arsenal prevailed, winning 3–2. This allowed the Gunners to move joint top with league leaders Manchester City. Arsenal would resume its Champions League campaign on 19 October, with a home game against Bulgarian champions, Ludogorets Razgrad. Goals from Sánchez, Walcott, Oxlade-Chamberlain and a career first hat-trick for Özil saw Arsenal to a resounding 6–0 win over the Bulgarians. The victory took the Gunners to seven wins in a row in all competitions.

Arsenal's next game would be at home to Middlesbrough in the Premier League. In an end to end clash, Arsenal were denied a late goal from Özil due to an offside, and the match finished 0–0. It was Arsenal's first draw at home since April, and their second of the season. It also ended a run of six consecutive league wins. Arsenal's next match was a home tie in the EFL Cup against Reading. The sides met nearly four years after a famous 7–5 Arsenal win at the same stage of the competition. Oxlade-Chamberlain continued his fine form with a double to give Arsenal a 2–0 win, and set up a quarter final clash with Southampton on 30 November. Oxlade-Chamberlain's form saw him awarded with a Premier League start against basement side Sunderland. The winger provided an assist as doubles from Olivier Giroud, his first goals of the season, and from Sánchez saw Arsenal convincingly win 4–1. A Jermain Defoe penalty helped the Black Cats get onto the scoresheet. Arsenal's next game would be away at Ludogorets in the Champions League on 1 November.

November

Arsenal started November with a Champions League game away to Ludogorets Razgrad. Despite the Bulgarian side going into a shock 2–0 lead early on, Arsenal eventually came back with goals through Granit Xhaka, Olivier Giroud and a late Mesut Özil goal to win 3–2 and qualify for the knockout stages. This took Arsenal's unbeaten run to 15 games in all competitions. Arsenal then participated in the North London derby, hosting Tottenham Hotspur in Premier League action on 6 November. Arsenal gained the lead just prior to the half-time break, with Kevin Wimmer glancing Özil's free-kick past Hugo Lloris, before Spurs responded with a Harry Kane spot-kick following a tangle between Laurent Koscielny and Mousa Dembélé. Despite presses from either side late on, the game ended 1–1, and left Arsenal fourth in the Premier League going into the international break. Arsenal returned to Premier League action against Manchester United at Old Trafford on 19 November. During the match, Arsenal had not had an effort on goal and often conceded to allow United to control the game for long periods, and their advances toward goal were rewarded through a Juan Mata left-foot finish after 68 minutes. During the dying moments of the game, however, a substitute Giroud rose at the far post to head home an Alex Oxlade-Chamberlain cross.

Arsenal then continued in their Champions League campaign with a home game to Paris-Saint Germain, with Arsenal requiring a win to secure top spot in their group as the first round concludes, finishing second in six consecutive seasons. Early on, Edinson Cavani slide home from a Blaise Matuidi cross, before Arsenal gained one back through a penalty from Giroud after a Grzegorz Krychowiak tackle on Alexis Sánchez. Midway through the second half, Arsenal obtained the lead when a penalty-box rebound struck Marco Verratti, before PSG responded through a ricocheted Lucas header off Alex Iwobi 13 minutes from time as the game ended 2–2. The French champions now have an advantage on head-to-head away goals with one round of games left after a 1–1 draw earlier in the competition. The Gunners then hosted AFC Bournemouth on 27 November, and were gifted the lead when Steve Cook's poor backpass allowed Sánchez to calmly side-foot past Adam Federici. Despite Callum Wilson's penalty equaliser, Walcott managed to score after a Nacho Monreal cross in the 58th minute, before Sánchez secured the victory after slotting in Giroud's cross, moving the Gunners to fourth, three points behind leaders Chelsea. To conclude November, Arsenal welcomed Southampton to play in the quarter-finals of EFL Cup, hoping to win the competition for the first time in Wenger's tenure at the club. The Gunners fielded a side with 10 changes to the previous game, and saw Jordy Clasie and Ryan Bertrand secure victory and inflict the first defeat on Arsenal since the opening day of the season, as Arsenal bowed out of the competition.

December
Arsenal responded to the midweek League Cup defeat with a dominant 5–1 win at West Ham United. Mesut Özil opened the scoring before Alexis Sánchez scored two goals in eight minutes. Substitute Andy Carroll headed home to give the hosts hope but it was determined for three points to go Arsenal's favour as Alex Oxlade-Chamberlain struck a 25-yard strike before Sánchez completed his hat trick, sprinting through the West Ham defence and chipping in. Three days later was the Gunners' final Champions League group match against Basel in Switzerland. Arsenal, who started a few of the fringe players for this match, prevailed 4–1 with Lucas Pérez scoring a hat-trick as well as Alex Iwobi tapping in his first goal of the season. On 10 December Arsenal continued the Premier League campaign as they faced Stoke City at the Emirates. Charlie Adam's penalty gave the visitors a shock lead but Arsenal replied with Theo Walcott equalising before second half goals by Özil and Iwobi as the Gunners ultimately won 3–1.

A run of 14 league matches unbeaten were responded bitterly by back-to-back away defeats just before Christmas. First Arsenal took on Everton at Goodison Park but lost 2–1. Despite the Gunners taking the lead through Alexis Sánchez's deflected free kick the hosts equalised before half-time through Séamus Coleman before Ashley Williams headed home a late winner. Phil Jagielka was then sent off as Arsenal pressed on to find an equaliser and had two shots cleared off the line. Everton held on to win and end Arsenal's unbeaten run in the Premier League. It got worse for them five days later as they lost against Manchester City at the Etihad. Theo Walcott scored early in the first half but City responded during the second. Leroy Sané netted the equaliser on 47 minutes before Raheem Sterling scored the winner from a tight angle. The match ended 2–1 to Manchester City inflicting a second consecutive league defeat on Arsenal. However Arsenal went on to win the next Premier League match against West Bromwich Albion at the Emirates. Olivier Giroud, who made his first league start of the season, scored the winner to revive Arsenal's title hopes. The Gunners' final match of the year ended in relieving victory.

January
On New Year's Day, Arsenal continued the league campaign and played against Premier League strugglers Crystal Palace. Arsenal won the match 2-0. On 17 minutes, Olivier Giroud established the lead in tremendous fashion, meeting Alexis Sánchez's cross and reaching the ball with his left foot from behind his head, ergo a scorpion kick which brought the ball off the underside of the bar and into the net – a response originally to Henrikh Mkhitaryan's scorpion goal for Manchester United against Sunderland on Boxing Day. Alex Iwobi scored the second goal, tamely heading the ball towards the back of the net via a desperate attempt by Palace defender Joel Ward to head it off the goal line only to head it onto his own bar, ricocheting it into the net. Next, only two days later, Arsenal took the trip to the South Coast as they faced Bournemouth. Arsenal were very shaky throughout the first half and early stages of the second and goals by Charlie Daniels, Callum Wilson and Ryan Fraser helped Bournemouth take a shock 3–0 lead. However, during the final 20 minutes the Gunners mounted an emphatic comeback with Alexis Sánchez and Lucas Pérez both scoring before Simon Francis was sent off. Giroud then netted the equaliser in stoppage time to ensure a dramatic 3–3 draw. On 7 January, Arsenal started their FA Cup campaign in the third round against Championship side Preston North End at Deepdale. Once more, Arsenal were shoddy in the early minutes and fell behind in the seventh minute through poor defending; but the Gunners responded in the second half. Aaron Ramsey made it 1–1 in the very first minute of the half and Giroud's goalscoring form continued tapping home an 89th-minute winner.

On 14 January Arsenal went to South Wales for the next Premier League match and won 4–0 at Swansea. Olivier Giroud scored his fifth goal in five matches, followed by own goals by Jack Cork and Kyle Naughton, before the fourth goal was fired home by Alexis Sánchez. Eight days later Arsenal faced Burnley at the Emirates. Following a goalless first half, Shkodran Mustafi scored his first Arsenal goal, heading home from a corner on 59 minutes. Granit Xhaka was then unusually sent off by referee Jonathan Moss and in stoppage time it got much more dramatic: in the 93rd minute Burnley were awarded a penalty through which Andre Gray scored. A cruel hammer blow for Arsenal meant that it was destined for the visitors to bring back a point but then in the 97th minute the Gunners themselves were handed a penalty despite an offside appeal. Sánchez scored from the spot in the final minute of stoppage time to keep the three points in North London. The match moreover saw Arsène Wenger get sent off for complaining to the fourth official about the Burnley penalty decision. For this offense Wenger was given a domestic four match ban which made him sit on the 'naughty step' and watch assistant manager Steve Bould do the touchline duties for the next four matches. On 28 January, Arsenal played in the FA Cup fourth round at Southampton. A brace by Danny Welbeck and a hat trick by Theo Walcott made them cruise into the fifth round with a comfortable 5-0 win. Two days later Arsenal continued the Premier League campaign but they suffered a shock 2–1 home defeat by Watford. Former Tottenham defender Younès Kaboul gave the visitors the lead through a deflected strike from outside the box early in the first half and three minutes later Troy Deeney doubled Watford's advantage. In the second half Arsenal were back into it as Alex Iwobi gave the Gunners hope. Arsenal piled on the pressure for the remaining minutes and Lucas Pérez hit the bar but they were unable to get the equaliser. The match ended 2–1 to Watford as the month of January ended harshly for the Gunners.

February

Arsenal's Premier League setback continued as they were beaten by Chelsea 3–1 at Stamford Bridge. Marcos Alonso scored the only goal of the first half before Eden Hazard wrapped up a fine solo goal. Cesc Fàbregas scored against his old club for Chelsea's third before Olivier Giroud netted a late consolation goal. On 11 February however the Gunners bounced back as they eased past Hull at the Emirates. In the first half Alexis Sánchez bundled home the opening goal despite replays showing the ball hit his hand before it went into the back of the net. Arsenal grabbed a second in stoppage time as Sánchez converted a 93rd-minute penalty following handball by Sam Clucas which resulted into his dismissal. Four days later Arsenal played in the knockout stage of the Champions League against German giants and five-times European champions Bayern Munich at the Allianz Arena. The Gunners were undone and under pressure by the Bayern possession and fell behind on 11 minutes through Arjen Robben's 20-yard screamer. However, in the 30th minute Arsenal were handed a penalty and Sánchez slotted home the rebound following his initial spot-kick being saved by Manuel Neuer as the first half ended 1–1 with much cherished positivity for the Gunners. Unfortunately in the second half Arsenal collapsed horrendously: first they lost captain Laurent Koscielny through injury which proved to be the catalyst for Arsenal's capitulation as they conceded three goals in ten minutes. Bayern Munich went back in front in the 53rd minute as Robert Lewandowski mismatched Shkodran Mustafi to head home Philipp Lahm's cross. Then, only three minutes later, Spanish midfielder Thiago made it 3–1 and sooner Bayern Munich were 4–1 up through Thiago's deflected shot from outside the penalty area following a scramble in the box. Finally in the 88th minute Thomas Müller, who had only scored four goals this season before the match, went off the bench and scored a fifth goal for Bayern Munich to put Arsenal's hopes of reaching the quarter-final of the Champions League beyond them. The match ended 5–1 to Bayern Munich putting Arsène Wenger under huge pressure. On 20 February Arsenal resumed the FA Cup campaign as they took the trip to non-league team Sutton United. The Gunners comfortably won 2–0 with Lucas Pérez scoring his 7th goal of the season and Theo Walcott scoring his 100th Arsenal goal as they progressed into the FA Cup quarter-final.

March
Arsenal started March away to Liverpool and suffered a 3–1 defeat with goals from Roberto Firmino, Sadio Mané and Georginio Wijnaldum. Arsene Wenger drew much criticism from supporters following his decision to leave Alexis Sánchez out of the starting lineup. Three days later, Bayern Munich, already 5–1 up from the first leg of the Champions League knockout stage came to the Emirates for the second leg. Arsenal started brightly and went into half-time winning 1–0 courtesy of Theo Walcott. However, early on in the second half, Laurent Koscielny gave away a penalty for a foul on Robert Lewandowski and was shown a yellow card. However, referee Anastasios Sidiropoulos then changed his mind and sent-off Koscielny. Lewandowski scored the penalty and then Bayern proceeded to run riot against 10-man Arsenal and goals from Arjen Robben, Douglas Costa and a brace from Arturo Vidal ensured Bayern again won 5–1. Arsenal lost 10–2 on aggregate and Wenger had to endure increasing calls for him to be sacked or resign. At the weekend, though Arsenal beat non-league Lincoln City 5–0 in the FA Cup to set up a semi-final against Manchester City at Wembley. However, Arsenal's poor form throughout 2017 continued in the league as they were soundly beaten 3–1 away to West Bromwich Albion, putting their hopes of a top four finish in serious doubt.

April
After the international break, Arsenal returned to action with an exciting 2–2 draw at home to Manchester City. After the game there was an outbreak of violence between supporters who wanted Wenger to remain as manager and supporters who wanted him to leave. In the next fixture against West Ham, three second-half goals from Mesut Özil, Theo Walcott and Olivier Giroud gave Arsenal their first league win since February. This was undone however the following week when they lost 3–0 away to Crystal Palace, who were fighting for Premier League survival. The result put Arsenal seven points off fourth place and fans chanted "you're not fit to wear the shirt" at the team. To rectify the decline, for the next match away to Middlesbrough, Wenger decided to change the formation to 3–4–3 which eventual champions Chelsea had been playing with for almost the whole season. It worked as Arsenal won 2–1 with goals from Alexis Sánchez and Mesut Özil. Arsenal's next outing would be against Manchester City at Wembley in the semi-final of the FA Cup. Manchester City came into the match as favourites and Sergio Aguero put them in front after the hour. 10 minutes later, wing-back Nacho Monreal equalised and the game went to extra-time where Alexis Sánchez scored the winning goal to book Arsenal's place in the final against Chelsea. Their improvement in form was highlighted three days later when they beat Leicester 1–0 with a late Robert Huth own goal. However, their decline was also shown when they lost 2–0 to Spurs in the last ever North London Derby to take place at White Hart Lane before its demolition. The result meant Spurs would finish above Arsenal for the first time in over 20 years.

May

After the morale-sapping defeat at White Hart Lane, the Gunners played host to Manchester United in a critical match at the Emirates Stadium. After a goalless first period, Granit Xhaka's wildly deflected effort soared into the net, before Danny Welbeck nodded home three minutes later to seal a vital 2–0 victory and subsequently end United's 25-match unbeaten run in all competitions.

The Gunners' next match was away to Southampton, and second-half goals from Alexis Sanchez and Olivier Giroud earned Arsenal a routine 2–0 victory, before Giroud scored a brace to lay the foundations for a convincing 4–1 win at Stoke City, with Sanchez and Ozil also scoring either side of a Peter Crouch goal.

With the top four still a valid hope, Arsenal played host to Sunderland, and despite winning the match 2–0, had to work hard for the three points, earned with Alexis Sanchez's late brace.

Coming into the final matchday, Arsenal were tipped to fail in their top-four bids as they were relying on slip-ups from Liverpool or Manchester City, who were playing Middlesbrough at home and Watford away, respectively.

Nonetheless, the Gunners made the perfect start, with Hector Bellerin rifling home after just eight minutes against Everton. However, a red-card for Laurent Koscielny hindered Arsenal's progress, but Sanchez nonetheless managed to extend the lead before the break.
Despite Romelu Lukaku's penalty cutting the deficit to 2–1, a fine, curling finish from Aaron Ramsey in stoppage time sealed a 3–1 win; but it was all in vain, as Liverpool's 3–0 triumph over Middlesbrough and Manchester City's 6-1 drubbing of Watford meant Arsenal finished outside of the top four for the first time in Arsène Wenger's reign.

Despite missing out on Champions League qualification, Arsenal still had the FA Cup final at Wembley to look forward to, and Alexis Sanchez gave them the perfect start after just four minutes against Chelsea, who were looking to win the Double.
However, despite being reduced to ten men after Victor Moses's red card early in the second half, Chelsea managed to equalise on 76 minutes through an improvised Diego Costa volley. However, just three minutes later, Aaron Ramsey powered home Olivier Giroud's cross with a solid header to seal a 2–1 win, and with it, a record 13th FA Cup for Arsenal and Arsène Weneger's seventh winners medal as a turbulent and difficult season ended on a high.

Players

Squad information

Transfers

Transfers in
Arsenal started its transfer business early, acquiring Swiss midfielder Granit Xhaka for a reported £30 million from Borussia Mönchengladbach on 25 May. Arsenal continued their recruitment in July, signing young forward Takuma Asano from Sanfrecce Hiroshima for an undisclosed fee, widely believed to be £800,000. On 22 July, Arsenal confirmed their third summer signing in Rob Holding, with the defender joining from Bolton Wanderers for a reported fee of £2 million. The club would later sign Nigerian prospect Kelechi Nwakali, who joined the Arsenal reserve team on a five-year deal. Arsenal would move for Lucas Pérez and Shkodran Mustafi late in the transfer window, with the La Liga duo eventually joining for a reported £17.1 million and £35 million respectively.

Total spending:   Undisclosed (~£87,940,000)

Transfers out

Total incoming:   Undisclosed (~£7,500,000+)

Loans in

Loans out

Overall transfer activity

Spending

Summer:   Undisclosed (~£87,900,000)

Winter:  Undisclosed (~£40,000)

Total:   Undisclosed (~£87,940,000)

Income

Summer:  Undisclosed (~£7,500,000+)

Winter:  £0

Total:  Undisclosed (~£7,500,000+)

Net expenditure

Summer:   Undisclosed (~£80,400,000-)

Winter:  Undisclosed (~£40,000)

Total:   Undisclosed (~£80,440,000-)

Club

Coaching staff

Kit
Supplier: Puma / Sponsor: Fly Emirates

Kit information
This is third consecutive season Puma has supplied Arsenal with kits.

Home: The home kit features Arsenal's traditional colours of red and white, with the addition of a dark trim around the lowered neck line, on the sleeve (hooped) and along the red stripe on the shorts. The distinguishing feature of the kit is the darkened, vertical, red stripe across the centre of the kit. It also features predominantly red socks for the first time since the 2004–05 season (as opposed to only featuring on the alternate kits).
Away: The away kit is predominantly yellow following the trend of recent Arsenal away kits. The contrasting colour is "gunmetal grey" which appears on the collar (alongside a thin, centred, yellow line), as a trim on the v-shaped neck line and on the sleeve, separated by a large yellow strip across the shoulders and multiple hooped yellow lines across the bottom section of the sleeve. The shorts are predominantly gunmetal grey, with a yellow trim along the sides. The socks are yellow with multiple gunmetal grey hooped lines on the upper section.
Third: The third kit is an abstraction from previous alternate kits for Arsenal as it predominantly features a single colour of dark blue. A vibrant neon yellow forms the detail across a wide strip on the shoulder and on the cuffs of the sleeves. The shorts are also dark blue with neon yellow detail along the sides and the kit is completed with single-colour neon yellow socks with a single dark blue hoop on the upper section.

Other information

Squad statistics

Appearances and goals
Numbers in parenthesis denote appearances as substitute.

Goalscorers

Disciplinary record

Clean sheets

Pre-season

In February 2016, it was announced that Arsenal would play in the Major League Soccer All-Star Game at Avaya Stadium in San Jose, California in addition to a friendly against Mexican side Guadalajara three days later. However, Arsenal later announced that the annual Emirates Cup would be cancelled for the second time in its history due to the extended absence of international players participating in Euro 2016 and "essential pitch reconstruction works" at the Emirates Stadium. Arsenal confirmed their final pre-season fixtures before the Premier League campaign in early-June 2016, as Scandinavian trips against Viking in Stavanger and Premier League rivals Manchester City in Gothenburg completed the line-up. It is the third time in four years that Arsenal and Manchester City will meet in a pre-season fixture outside of England. To complete Arsenal's pre-season calendar, in early-July, Arsenal announced their pre-season opening fixture against RC Lens of Ligue 2 to be played 15 days after the announcement date. It was hence confirmed that the club's pre-season fixture list would stretch from 22 July to 7 August 2016 (six days before the start of the Premier League season).

MLS All-Star Game

Super Match

Competitions

Overview

{| class="wikitable" style="text-align: center"
|-
!rowspan=2|Competition
!colspan=8|Record
|-
!
!
!
!
!
!
!
!
|-
| Premier League

|-
| FA Cup

|-
| EFL Cup

|-
| Champions League

|-
! Total

Premier League

League table

Results summary

Results by matchday

Matches
On 15 June 2016, the fixtures for the forthcoming season were announced.

FA Cup

EFL Cup

UEFA Champions League

Arsenal qualified for the group stage of the 2016–17 UEFA Champions League due to finishing second in the 2015–16 Premier League. This meant that Arsenal qualified for the UEFA Champions League for the 19th consecutive season.

Group stage

The Gunners were drawn against French side Paris Saint-Germain, Swiss club Basel and Bulgarian team Ludogorets Razgrad.

Knockout phase

Round of 16
The draw was held on 12 December 2016, with Arsenal amongst the seeded teams (as group winners) drawn against one of the unseeded runners-up, Bayern Munich. The first leg was played away on 15 February, and the second leg was played at home on 7 March 2017.

Awards

Arsenal Player of the Month award

Awarded monthly to the player that was chosen by fan voting on Arsenal.com

References

Arsenal
Arsenal F.C. seasons
Arsenal F.C.